The 2020 Charlotte 49ers baseball team represents the University of North Carolina at Charlotte in the sport of baseball during the 2020 college baseball season.  Charlotte competes in Conference USA (C-USA).  Home games are played at Robert and Mariam Hayes Stadium on the university's Charlotte, North Carolina campus.  The team is coached by Robert Woodard in his first season as the 49ers' head coach.

Preseason

C-USA Preseason poll
The Conference USA Preseason Poll was released on January 29, 2020 as selected by the conference's head coaches. Charlotte was selected eleventh in order of finish for the season.

Schedule

Roster

Coaching staff

References

Charlotte 49ers
Charlotte 49ers baseball seasons
Charlotte 49ers baseball